Heroes of Remix, or simply The Remix, is a Chinese sing and dance reality television competition on Jiangsu Television. The show first aired on June 19, 2016, and it is hosted by Li Hao (李好). The mentors of the show include Psy, Leehom Wang, Harlem Yu, and Phoenix Legend.

Overview
The series is based on a similar competition format in Vietnam with the same name. Different from the past variety shows in China, the show features Electronic Dance Music (EDM) marking China's first-ever variety show featuring the music genre.

With the introduction of EDM in the western world, the show hopes to extend its possibilities of electronic music-making in China. According to People's Daily'''s music producer Liu Zhou (刘洲), "In China, the development of EDM somewhat lags behind, and we are not able to keep up with industry trends. If everyone else is making electronic music but we are not, we will stay behind." In this sense, Heroes of Remix aims to introduce the real meaning of EDM to its viewers, particularly to the Chinese people.

In contrast to the popular belief that EDM is all about being 'fast-tempo nightclub tunes' only, the show would bring about the 'true essence of electronic music' in the context of Chinese music. However, since EDM is defined as "...one of the most transportable" by Forbes Magazine, not only will the performers bring elements of Chinese traditional culture into the remixes of their songs but they are also welcome to incorporate other traditional cultures from other countries. In this way, they would be producing new and creative remixes of their songs.

FormatHeroes of Remix highlights the performers' and mentors' talents in producing Chinese EDM music. Performers (bands or soloists) would perform their own rendition to their song choice under the guidance of their mentors. They are welcome to interpret and remix the songs in any way possible. Audience would then vote for their winning group/soloist by the end of each show.

Development
In April 2016, Chinese-American singer-songwriter Leehom Wang was confirmed to join Heroes of Remix'' together with South Korean singer-songwriter and rapper Psy. The two already met once during the 2012 Mnet Asian Music Awards in Hong Kong. On May 12, the variety show held a press conference in Zhuhai. It was reported that the show would provide virtual reality (VR) content and production. Star Media CEO Tian Ming said that VR content would allow viewers to fully experience the backstage activities in their perspective and  be able to interact with the artists/performers, which is different from traditional television. Five days after, it was announced that the variety show was set to air in June on Jiangsu TV. By then, Chinese music duo Yangwei Linghua and Zeng Yi, and Chinese singer-songwriter Harlem Yu have been announced as mentors already.

Mentors and performers

Episode overview
Color key

Episode 1 (June 19)
On its first episode, two of the mentors performed an opening number. Leehom Wang sang "蓋世英雄" ("Gai Shi Ying Xiong") first, then followed by Psy singing "Daddy" and "Gangnam Style". After their performance, four mentors were introduced and the performances commenced.

Episode 2 (July 3)
Phoenix Legend's Danny Lee and Ivy were the first ones to perform this week again. Last week's winner, iKon then performed second with only three members. Wang's Summer, who performed last, received the highest number of votes by the end of the show.

Episode 3 (July 10)
This week marks the first time the audience would vote twice: one for the first half of the show and another for the second half. Last week's winner, Summer, performed first this week. William Wei, who performed for the first time, performed with his mentor, Leehom Wang. Meanwhile, iKon received their second win for their "Rhythm Ta"/"Master Zhou" performance.

Episode 4 (July 17)
Last week's winner, iKon, opened the competition. On the other hand, Liu Meilin was asked to repeat her performance due to some unfortunate circumstances.

Episode 5 (July 24)
Last week's winner VIXX was the first one to perform this week, while Wowkie Zhang debuted in the show. Also, iKon won for the third time after performing Park Jin-Young's "Honey" and dancing to the tune of Michael Jackson's "Billie Jean".

Episode 6 (July 31)
Three-time winner iKon opened the show with David Tao's "Love is Very Simple". On the other hand, Liu Meilin received her first win.

Episode 7 (August 7)
South Korean group iKon was the first one to perform for the second consecutive time. However, they lost to first-time winners Danny Lee and Ivy.

Episode 8 (August 14)
After his two weeks of absence, Wang's William Wei was the first one to perform. Also from team Wang, Li Qi, who performed for the first time, ended this week's competition.

Episode 9 (August 21)
In this episode, a number of performers were not present, particularly the South Korean acts. Psy's appearance was notably blurred out as well. However, three new artists performed for the first time including Queen T, Zhang Wei, and girl group MG女团. There were only seven performances all in all.

Episode 10 (August 28)
Seven artists performed this week. By the end of the performances, Wang received his third win as a mentor.

Golden Music Festival (September 4)

Opening medley

Summary of results
The table below shows the number of times contestants win per week:

Controversies
In the ninth episode, August 21, a number of performers were not present, particularly performers from South Korea. Psy's appearance was blurred out while he was also removed from the program's official website. The ongoing Terminal High Altitude Area Defense (THAAD) issue wherein Chinese Foreign Minister Wang Yi expressed concerns against the deployment of THAAD in South Korea that could jeopardize China's "legitimate national security interest" may be the reason.

References

External links
 
 

Chinese music television series
Chinese reality television series
2016 Chinese television series debuts
Mandarin-language television shows
2010s music television series